Gudavalli may refer to:

Places

Andhra Pradesh, India 
Gudavalli, Guntur district
Gudavalli, Krishna district